The Edda Award is an accolade bestowed annually by the Icelandic Film and Television Academy, and is the most prominent film and television award in Iceland, awarded annually in February. The Edda has awarded for outstanding work in various categories of film and television annually since 1999, except in 2009 due to the economic crash the year before. In 2010, the event was moved from the usual November date to February, and the eligibility period for that year was from 1 November 2008 to 30 December 2009. Since 2011, the eligibility period is the previous calendar year.

Categories

Edda Award for Best Film
Edda Award for Best Leading Actor or Actress
 Edda Award for Best Supporting Actor or Actress
Edda Award for Best Director
 Edda Award for Best Documentary
Edda Award for Best Television Program
Edda Award for Best Television Personality

Ceremonies

References

External links 
 Edda Awards Official Website

Icelandic film awards